Hunza (also Romanized as Hūnzā; also known as Khūnzā) is a village in Simakan Rural District, in the Central District of Bavanat County, Fars Province, Iran. At the 2006 census, its population was 194, in 38 families.

References 

Populated places in Bavanat County